Doc's da Name 2000 is the fourth studio album by American rapper Redman. The album was released on Def Jam Recordings on December 8, 1998. It peaked at number 11 on the US Billboard 200. It was a top seller, being certified platinum for sales of over a million copies.

The song "Da Goodness'' is sampled in the Barbadian soca beat "Redman/Da Goodness Riddim" in 1999. The song "Let Da Monkey Out" was featured in the 2005 film Syriana.

Commercial performance
Doc's da Name 2000 debuted at number 11 on the US Billboard 200 chart, and number one on the US Top R&B/Hip-Hop Albums, becoming his third number one on the chart. On February 17, 1999, the album was certified platinum by the Recording Industry Association of America (RIAA) for sales of over a million copies. The album was certified only two months after being released. As of October 2009, the album has 1,056,000 copies in the United States.

Track listing

Samples
Welcome 2 Da Bricks
"Black Wonders of the World" by Billy Paul
Let Da Monkey Out
"Stomp and Buck Dance" by The Crusaders
Get It Live
"Just Rhymin' With Biz" by Big Daddy Kane
Jersey Yo!
"Shoo-B-Doop and Cop Him" by Betty Davis
I Don't Kare
"The Champ" by The Mohawks 
"Super Thug" by N.O.R.E
"Top Billin'" by Audio Two 
Boodah Break
"Beats to the Rhyme" by Run-DMC
"Caught, Can I Get a Witness?" by Public Enemy
Keep On '99
"Can't Run, Can't Hide" by Ray J
"She Swallowed It" by N.W.A
Da Goodness
"Caravan" by Buddy Merrill
"It's All About the Benjamins" by Puff Daddy
My Zone!
"How I Could Just Kill a Man" by Cypress Hill
Da Da Dahhh
"It's a Sad Song" by Don Julian
Down South Funk
"La Di Da Di" by Doug E. Fresh and Slick Rick 
D.O.G.S.
"Ladies in Da House" by Aaliyah
"Atomic Dog" by George Clinton
Brick City Mashin'!
"Genius of Love" by Tom Tom Club
"Triple Threat" by Z-3 MC's
Soopaman Lova IV
"You've Got a Hard Head" by Johnny "Guitar" Watson
I Got a Seecret
"Around the World" by Attilio Mineo

Charts

Weekly charts

Year-end charts

Certifications

See also
List of number-one R&B albums of 1998 (U.S.)

References

1998 albums
Redman (rapper) albums
Def Jam Recordings albums
Albums produced by Erick Sermon
Albums produced by Rockwilder